Streptomyces tauricus is a bacterium species from the genus of Streptomyces. Streptomyces tauricus produces tauromycetin.

See also 
 List of Streptomyces species

References

Further reading

External links
Type strain of Streptomyces tauricus at BacDive -  the Bacterial Diversity Metadatabase	

tauricus
Bacteria described in 1986